770 Bali is a minor planet orbiting the Sun. It is a member of the Flora family. It was discovered on 31 October 1913, by German astronomer Adam Massinger at the Heidelberg Observatory in southwest Germany. The asteroid was probably named after the Indonesian island of Bali, as the discoverer had named a couple other asteroids after places in Indonesia. The alternative hypothesis is that it was named after Bali, king of the Daityas in Hindu mythology.

References

External links 
 
 

000770
Discoveries by Adam Massinger
Named minor planets
000770
19131031